Jeffrey Lawrence Alm (March 31, 1968 – December 14, 1993) was an American football defensive tackle for the Houston Oilers of the National Football League (NFL). He played four seasons with the Oilers until his suicide in 1993. 

Alm played college football at Notre Dame and was selected by Houston in the second round of the 1990 NFL Draft. A backup for most of his career, Alm's death during the 1993 season received national attention when he shot himself immediately following a DUI car crash that killed his friend. His death was noted as one of several incidents to afflict the Oilers that year.

Early life and college career
Born in New York City, Alm grew up in Orland Park, Illinois, a southwest suburb of Chicago. He had three siblings and was raised by his mother and stepfather after his biological parents divorced. Alm played for the Carl Sandburg High School football team, earning all-state honors. During his junior year, he met Sean P. Lynch, a transfer student, while playing on the football field together. Alm and Lynch eventually became best friends despite their differences in both personality and stature and were inseparable. As Alm's mother, Betty, described: "I always described them as Mutt and Jeff. Sean was so little. They looked so funny together."

Alm eventually earned a football scholarship to Notre Dame. Alm was described by his teammates and friends as introspective and intellectual, completing a degree in marketing. He was praised for his work ethic by teammates and was named a second-team All-American during his senior year.

Professional career
Alm was selected by the Houston Oilers with their second-round pick in the 1990 NFL Draft. Throughout his career, Alm felt lonely in Houston and kept in touch with a handful of close friends from home and college, including Lynch. His final year was marred by a contract holdout and injury.

Car crash and subsequent suicide
According to a witness, while Lynch was visiting Alm, the pair had dinner at a Houston-area steakhouse on December 13, 1993. At 2:45 a.m. on the following day, Alm, who was speeding, lost control of his 1993 Cadillac Eldorado heading south on Interstate 610 southbound at the 59 North exit ramp and Lynch, who was not wearing his seatbelt, was ejected from the car. After the crash, Alm ran across the ramp and looked down an embankment towards the Southwest Freeway, discovering that Lynch had been thrown to his death 30 feet below. Apparently distraught by his best friend's death, Alm took out a pistol-grip shotgun, fired three shots into the air, and then shot himself in the head.

Alm had made a frantic 911 call to summon help. Alm shouted "Sean are you all right?" at the beginning of the call. In the ensuing moments, he tried to tell the operator the location of the wreck."Yes, I had an accident on, uh," Alm said. "I had an accident on 59, uh, on 59 north. Loop, uh, 610. I have a buddy dying!"

Toxicology reports stated that Alm had a blood alcohol level of .14, over the .10 legal limit. Lynch's blood-alcohol level was .30. Alm was also taking the prescription barbiturate Fiorinal, commonly prescribed for tension headaches. According to the report by Joseph A. Jachimczyk, Chief Medical Examiner for Harris County, the barbiturate level was within therapeutic range.

See also
Josh Brent
Henry Ruggs
List of American football players who died during their careers
1993 Houston Oilers season

References

External links

1968 births
1993 deaths
1993 suicides
American football defensive tackles
Houston Oilers players
Notre Dame Fighting Irish football players
Players of American football from New York City
Suicides by firearm in Texas
Burials in Illinois